William Hinnant (born John F. Hinnant; August 28, 1935 – February 17, 1978) was an American actor. His younger brother is actor and comedian Skip Hinnant.

Biography
Hinnant was born John F. Hinnant in Chincoteague Island, Virginia. He attended Yale University, but left after his sophomore year in 1958 to originate the role of the navigator in the Broadway play, No Time for Sergeants. He later returned to Yale, and graduated in 1959.

After completing college, Hinnant appeared in the Julius Monk revue Dressed to the Nines. In the late 1950s and early 1960s, he appeared in few theatre roles and guest starred on various television programs, including four episodes of the CBS sitcom, Pete and Gladys. He was cast as Bruce Carter, a 26-year-old college student (though he had already graduated from Yale in real life) who lives temporarily in  Westwood, Los Angeles, California, with his aunt, Gladys (Cara Williams), and her husband, insurance salesman, Pete Porter (Harry Morgan). Hinnant also appeared on the long-running CBS game show, To Tell the Truth. He was cast in the revues, All Kinds of Giants and Put it in Writing in 1962 and 1963.

Hinnant's most successful role came in March 1967, when he was cast as Snoopy in the off-Broadway production of Clark Gesner's You're a Good Man, Charlie Brown, after voicing the character on Gesner's ten-song concept album. Hinnant (whose younger brother Skip was cast as Schroeder in the same production) was praised as the "most strikingly talented of the cast" and won a Drama Desk Award for his performance. Theatre critic Steven Suskin wrote, "As in Snoopy's showstopper 'Suppertime' - you totally forgot the teensy scale. When Bill Hinnant leapt from atop his doghouse and went into a cakewalk, the spirit and the show soared."<ref>Suskin, Steven. On the Record: "Mamma, Elaine's King & Charlie Brown", November 26, 2000] </ref>

After ...Charlie Brown, Hinnant appeared in Norman Kline's The American Hamburger League off-Broadway in September 1969. He then appeared in the 1971 Broadway musical Frank Merriwell.

When You're a Good Man, Charlie Brown was adapted for a Hallmark Hall of Fame television special in 1973, Hinnant reprised his role as Snoopy. Hinnant was the only member of the original off-Broadway cast to reprise his role in the special.

Death
Hinnant died at age 42 on February 17, 1978. He drowned while vacationing in the Dominican Republic. In February 1990, archival footage posthumously showed Hinnant singing "Suppertime" in the Peanuts'' documentary [https://www.imdb.com/title/tt0264198 "You Don't Look 40, Charlie Brown!"

References

External links
 Bill Hinnant profile at Lortel Archives
 
 

1935 births
1978 deaths
Male actors from Virginia
American male television actors
American male musical theatre actors
American male film actors
Yale University alumni
People from Chincoteague, Virginia
20th-century American male actors
Accidental deaths in the Dominican Republic
Deaths by drowning
20th-century American singers
20th-century American male singers